Jilson Bango (born 6 January 1999) is an Angolan basketball player who plays for the Basketball Löwen Braunschweig of the Basketball Bundesliga, and the Angola national team.

Professional career
In 2019, Bango started playing for Primeiro de Agosto. He was named the Angolan Basketball League's Regular Season MVP for two consecutive seasons (2021 and 2022). Bango also led the league in rebounding in 2021.

On 9 September 2022, Bango signed a three-year contract with the Basketball Löwen Braunschweig of the German Basketball Bundesliga. On 3 October, he recorded 16 points and 9 rebounds in his league debut against Würzburg.

National team career
Internationally, Bango respresents the Angola national basketball team. He played with Angola at FIBA AfroCan 2019 and FIBA AfroBasket 2021, where he averaged 9.6 points and 9.6 rebound as the team's starting center.

References

External links
Jilson Bango at RealGM

1999 births
Living people
Angolan expatriate basketball people in Germany
Angolan men's basketball players
Basketball Löwen Braunschweig players
C.D. Primeiro de Agosto basketball players
Centers (basketball)